Ján Budaj (born 10 February 1952) is a Slovak politician and environmental activist. He is mostly known by his participation in the Velvet Revolution. Currently, he is the Minister of Environment serving from 21 March 2020, currently in the cabinet of Eduard Heger.

At the end of the 1970s, he founded the Temporary Society of Intensive Experience (DISP) with one of the first signatories of Charter 77 in Slovakia, Tomáš Petřivý, and the poet Vladimír Archleb. Within the framework of DISP, they created various events in the streets of Bratislava: happenings, unauthorized musical events, unofficial exhibitions, etc. In the 1980s, he worked as an ecological and civic activist, and was the compiler of the samizdat publication Bratislava/voice, published in 1987.

References

Living people
21st-century Slovak politicians
Year of birth missing (living people)
Members of the National Council (Slovakia) 2016-2020
Members of the National Council (Slovakia) 1998-2002